Frances Tiafoe was the defending champion but chose not to defend his title.

John Millman won the title after defeating Bernard Tomic 6–1, 6–2 in the final.

Seeds

Draw

Finals

Top half

Bottom half

References
Main Draw
Qualifying Draw

Open du Pays d'Aix - Singles
2018 Singles